Robert Earle Buchanan (March 27, 1883, Cedar Rapids, Iowa – 1973, Ames, Iowa) was an American bacteriologist and a professor and administrator at Iowa State University.
 He is known for his work on bacterial taxonomy.

Biography
Buchanan grew up on a farm. He graduated in 1904 with a B.S. and in 1906 with an M.S. from Iowa State College (now named Iowa State University). He worked as an undergraduate as a student assistant to Louis Hermann Pammel, whom he accompanied on botanical surveys. He was from 1904 to 1906 as teaching assistant in bacteriology under Pammel. In 1908 Buchanan received his Ph.D. in bacteriology from the University of Chicago. His doctoral dissertation The Morphology of Bacillus Radicicola, written under the supervision of Edwin O. Jordan, deals with nitrogen-fixing bacteria that live in the nodules of a variety of legume species. At Iowa State College, Buchanan was from 1908 to 1909 an associate professor and was appointed in 1909 a full professor. He founded in 1910 the college's department of bacteriology and headed the department until his retirement in 1948. Two important bacteriologists in the early history of the department are Max Levine (1889–1967) and Chester Hamlin Werkman (1893–1962) (who was Buchanan's doctoral student). Buchanan was the dean of Iowa State's Graduate College from 1919 to 1948 and director of the Iowa Agriculture Experiment Station from 1933 to 1945.

Buchanan was elected in 1913 a fellow of the American Association for the Advancement of Science. In 1918 he was the president of the Society of American Bacteriologists (renamed in 1960 the American Society for Microbiology). In 1935 he was the president of the Iowa Academy of Science.

He married Estelle Denis Fogel in 1910. Their son Joseph Hall Buchanan became a patent attorney and a brigadier-general.

Selected publications

Articles

Books

References

1883 births
1973 deaths
Iowa State University alumni
University of Chicago alumni
Iowa State University faculty
American bacteriologists
Fellows of the American Association for the Advancement of Science
Presidents of the American Society for Microbiology